Commonwealth Steel Company was an American steel company based in Granite City, Illinois and founded in 1901 "by some of the young men who had helped establish the American Steel Foundry". The company produced steel castings and railroad supplies at its  plant, employing about 1,500 people.

Over the years, the company's innovative steel castings products made Commonwealth an increasingly important manufacturer and supplier to the rail industry. By 1928 "practically all locomotives and passenger cars built in the United States" were using Commonwealth products. The significance of the company to the rail industry became evident when two locomotive manufacturers, and customers of Commonwealth, Baldwin Locomotive Company and American Locomotive Company, formed General Steel Castings Corporation in 1928 and acquired Commonwealth and its products in 1929.

Early history

, who controlled the Double Body Bolster Company, received orders for cast-steel bolsters for railroad passenger cars to be used in an exhibit at the upcoming 1904 St. Louis World's Fair but his company was unable to produce bolsters of the specified size.  Cast steel bolsters of that size had not been previously manufactured.  Mr. Howard negotiated with the Commonwealth Steel Company to produce the new steel bolsters and he assisted during the production process.  Clarence H. Howard, along with his former schoolmates, H. M. Pflager, and G. K. Hoblitzelle assumed control of Commonwealth in 1904.  Mr. Howard would head the company for 23 years and retire in April 1931, two years after Commonwealth merged with General Steel Castings Corporation and only months before his death in December 1931.

Company promotion of citizenship

The company was supportive of Americanization (helping foreigners adapt to the American way of life) efforts at Lincoln Place, providing free English-language classes to foreign-speaking immigrants, and was strongly in favor of Prohibition.  An article in the December 1915 issue of The Commonwealther was titled "A saloon is sometimes called a bar - and so it is!"  The company also encouraged fellowship and the Golden Rule through the Fellowship Club.

The company established the Commonwealth School in 1906 to serve the educational needs of "Commonwealthers."  Apprentices would be given up to four hours a week, on company time, to study mathematics, mechanical drawing, and blue print reading.

The company's school program expanded with the addition of a high school program in December 1923.  Conducted in cooperation with the local high school, Community High School, authorities of Granite City, Illinois and State educational authorities, the graduates of Commonwealth School's High School program received diplomas with the regular graduates of Community High School.  By the end of 1927, the Commonwealth School was offering the following programs with almost 200 employees enrolled:
Apprentice School, Night School Drawing, Eighth Grade School, High School, University Extension Courses, Special Engineering Class, Trade Knowledge Courses, Scholarships, and School Dinners.

Employees shared in the company's profits.  Meetings of the company's profit-sharing plan, known as the Commonwealth Plan, would start with the reciting of the Lord's Prayer and, in at least one meeting, the singing of "America".  The Platform of the "Commonwealth Plan", read in part:  "Fellowship is the Golden Rule in action, the motive power of human engineering, the life-blood of service, insuring equal opportunity for all.  The Commonwealth Plan recognizes all problems as mutual, wherein and whereby absolute confidence exists in the honesty of purpose and truth of character of each other; thus blending brotherly love in all activities and enabling each to develop his several talents."

Innovation and growth

Commonwealth set the standard for innovation.
During World War I, the company produced cast steel frames for gun tractors and locomotive castings. The company grew and by 1913 the company’s payroll exceeded $110,000 ($2,420,000 in 2010 dollars) for each pay period.
In 1924, the company finished the design and manufactured a one-piece underframe structure, or bed, for a steam locomotive and delivered it to the New York Central Railroad.  Also in 1924, the company embarked on a $1,500,000 ($33 million in 2010 dollars) expansion that included increasing the size of the foundry to a total length of  making it "probably the largest Open Hearth steel foundry building in the world", increased plant capacity by 35%, and was producing the "largest steel castings in the world".  
The Commonwealth plant also grew to cover .

The company's success in supplying large castings and parts to the rail industry necessitated the need for more capacity. With the completion of the new General Office Building on the site of its plant at 1417 State Street in Granite City, Illinois, the company's headquarters was relocated from the Pierce Building in St. Louis, Missouri to Granite City beginning on February 23, 1926. The foundry alone was over a third of a mile long, .

In 1926, the company produced a "one-piece locomotive bed with cylinders, steam chests, and saddle cast integral" and delivered it to the Terminal Railroad Association of St. Louis and, during this same period, cast steel underframes and trucks were developed for electric locomotives.  By 1928, "practically all locomotives and passenger cars built in the United States" were made using products manufactured at the Commonwealth plant.

Merger

An April 12, 1929 St. Louis Post-Dispatch newspaper article, reprinted in the April 1929 issue of The Commonwealther, noted "[t]he Commonwealth, largely because of its one-piece castings, does business with railroads all over the world. It is commonly thought not to have a competitor in the production of a one-piece frame for locomotives and coaches, a feat of casting that has at once made its business unique and added immensely to the safety of railroad travel."

The importance of Commonwealth Steel to the railroad industry was not overlooked by the industry and was underscored when two major locomotive companies, American Locomotive Company and Baldwin Locomotive Company, along with the American Steel Foundries, organized General Steel Castings Corporation in 1928 and subsequently purchased Commonwealth Steel.

The April 1929 issue of The Commonwealther printed a statement from the president of the company, Clarence Howard, announcing Commonwealth Steel was "working out a plan of unification" with the newly created General Steel Castings Corporation.

With a capitalization of $10 million, the company was acquired by the newly formed General Steel Castings Corporation for a reported $35 million.  The merge was effective "definitely on July 30, 1929" and the Commonwealth Steel Company became the "Commonwealth Division" of General Steel Castings Corporation.  General Steel's "Eddystone Division" would consist of a new foundry, still under construction in 1929, on the banks of the Delaware River in Eddystone, Pennsylvania, near Baldwin Locomotive's facilities.

References

Steel companies of the United States
Foundries in the United States
Companies based in Madison County, Illinois
American companies established in 1901
Manufacturing companies established in 1901
Manufacturing companies disestablished in 1929
1901 establishments in Illinois
1929 disestablishments in Illinois
Defunct manufacturing companies based in Illinois
Industrial buildings and structures in Illinois